Edmund Gibson MA (1713–1771) was a Canon of Windsor from 1742 to 1746.

Family
Gibson was born in 1713, the son of Edmund Gibson, Bishop of London.

Career
Gibson was educated at Christ Church, Oxford and graduated BA in 1734 and MA in 1737.

He was successively appointed:
Prebendary of Rugmere in St Paul's 1738–1741
Prebendary of Chiswick in St Paul's 1740–1744
Prebendary of Mapesbury in St Paul's 1743–1747
Prebendary of Kentish Town in St Paul's 1746–1770
Precentor of St Paul's Cathedral 1741–1770

In 1742 he was appointed to the eighth stall in St George's Chapel, Windsor Castle, where he held the canonry until 1746.

Notes

1711 births
1771 deaths
Canons of Windsor
Alumni of Christ Church, Oxford